Earl Edwards (born March 17, 1946) is a former American football and Canadian football player. He played at various including defensive tackle, offensive tackle and defensive end. Edwards played onoffensively and defense in college at Wichita State University where Hall of Fame coach Bill Parcells was his lineman coach. College was a short stop for "Big Earl" because he defended a team member (Melvin Cason), and his input was not appreciated, causing him to leave the team. In his two and a half years at Wichita State University he won Sophomore Lineman of the Year, All Conference 1st Team, All-Mid West 1st Team, and Honorable Mention All American.

In 1967, he was drafted by the Ottawa Rough Riders of the Canadian Football League, only to be traded to the Edmonton Eskimos without playing a down, for an All-Star kicker. Edmonton's offensive line coach Joe Spencer helped him become a stand-out Offensive Tackle (honorable mention All-pro) for two seasons. In 1969 the San Francisco 49ers traded 11 players (6 the first year and 5 the second year) for his draft rights because he still had one year left on his contract with the Canadian team (the Edmonton Eskimos). The 49ers' general manager Jack White stated in an article in the San Francisco Examiner, "if Edwards had remained in college and gone through the regular NFL draft, he would have been the first lineman drafted".

In 1969, his NFL rookie season, he won the 49ers' Rookie of the Year award and was runner-up to  Hall of Fame member "Mean Joe Greene" of the Pittsburgh Steelers for NFL Defensive Rookie of the Year award. In 1971, he was honorable mention All-pro at Defensive Tackle with the 49ers.

In 1973, he was traded to the Buffalo Bills for two players and switched again to defensive end where he received honorable mention All-Pro honors for the Bills. He was also selected for the Kelso Award which he shared with O. J. Simpson as the team's most valuable defensive and offensive players. In 1974 Street and Smith magazine rated Edwards as the most feared outside rusher in the NFL.

In 1976 Cleveland's defensive coordinator Dick Modzelewski and the Cleveland Browns traded two players for Edwards to play alongside star lineman Jerry Sherk at defensive tackle. Edwards was brought in to replace Walter Johnson, an outstanding defensive tackle in his own right. Coming off a torn hamstring muscle, Edwards played very little during the 1976 season but returned to proper form and status for the '77 and '78 seasons.

In 1979, he retired from football, but was coaxed into returning and helping Green Bay who had had a rash of injuries to their young defensive team by the then head coach Bart Starr.  In his first game back, he made major contributions and sacks in the  Monday night game of the week (October 1, 1979) against Steve Grogan and the New England Patriots. Packers won and he won the game ball which represented the 1000th game played in Packer history.  The season ended the career of one of the most versatile linemen in the NFL.

A total of 16 players were traded for his services over his career.  In 1969, he was added as a member of the Tampa Sports Hall of Fame, one of 52 stars chosen by the Tampa Bay Sports Club.

He helped the San Francisco 49ers win the NFC Western Division from 1970 to 1972.

He played 11 seasons in the National Football League as a defensive lineman for San Francisco, Buffalo, Cleveland and Green Bay between 1969 and 1979.  He was runner-up for NFL Rookie of the Year in 1969 behind Joe Greene. He's a member of the Tampa Sports Hall of Fame, one of 52 local stars chosen by the Tampa Bay Sports Club.

He has been married to Janice since 1988.  He has three sons, Big Reggie, Tall Gavin (who played college basketball for the Connecticut Huskies  and Big Damien who is a fifth year senior on the University of South Florida football team. He also has two daughters, Sandi and Brandi.

Edwards is now a substitute teacher in Arizona.

References

External links 
 NFL.com player page

1946 births
Living people
People from Statesboro, Georgia
American football defensive tackles
Buffalo Bills players
Cleveland Browns players
Edmonton Elks players
Green Bay Packers players
Players of American football from Georgia (U.S. state)
San Francisco 49ers players
Wichita State Shockers football players